Dezideriu Horvath (born 7 April 1970) is a Romanian speed skater. He competed at the 1994 Winter Olympics and the 1998 Winter Olympics.

References

1970 births
Living people
Romanian male speed skaters
Olympic speed skaters of Romania
Speed skaters at the 1994 Winter Olympics
Speed skaters at the 1998 Winter Olympics
People from Huedin